Cerura vinula, the puss moth, is a lepidopteran from the family Notodontidae. The species was first described by Carl Linnaeus in his 1758 10th edition of Systema Naturae.

Subspecies
Subspecies include:
Cerura vinula benderi (Lattin, Becker & Roesler, 1974)
Cerura vinula estonica (Huene, 1905)
Cerura vinula irakana (Heydemann, Schulte & Remane, 1963)
Cerura vinula phantoma (Dalman, 1823)
Cerura vinula vinula (Linnaeus, 1758)

Description

The head, thorax, and body of these moths are very fluffy, with a cat-like appearance (hence the common English name puss moth). The antennæ are bipectinated. They have white or yellowish-gray forewings crossed by several wave-like dark lines. The hindwings are light gray or whitish in the males, while in the females they are suffused with blackish but almost transparent. The body is whitish gray, with the dorsal abdomen banded in black.

In its last stage they are bright light green and have a blackish-brown or purplish-brown dorsal pattern outlined in white or yellowish. Young caterpillars are completely black. The abdomen ends in a tail fork with two long dark-colored tips bearing red extendable flagellae. The chrysalis is reddish brown, enclosed in a hard cocoon attached to the host plant.

Distribution
The moth is a Palearctic realm species and lives throughout Europe (Albania, Austria, Belarus, Belgium, Bosnia and Herzegovina, United Kingdom, Bulgaria, European Russia, Croatia, Czech Republic, Denmark, Estonia, European Turkey, Finland, France, Germany, Greece, Hungary, Ireland, Italy, Latvia, Lithuania, Republic of North Macedonia, Republic of Moldova, Norway, Poland, Romania, Slovakia, Slovenia, Spain, Sweden, Switzerland, The Netherlands, Ukraine and Yugoslavia), across temperate Asia to China and in North Africa.

Habitat
This moth mostly lives in very dense woodland areas.

Biology
The flight period extends from April to August, depending on elevation, with one generation per year. Host plants include willow and poplar, especially the aspen, Populus tremula.

The moth survives the winter as a pupa in a very solid wood-reinforced cocoon, usually attached to vegetation.

The caterpillars have a remarkable defensive behavior. When disturbed, they strike a defensive pose raising the head with a reddish area and waving the twin tails with pinkish extendable flagellae. They might squirt formic acid at the attacker if the defense warning is unheeded.

Gallery

References

External links
Paolo Mazzei, Daniel Morel, Raniero Panfili Moths and Butterflies of Europe and North Africa
Lepiforum e.V.
 Naturhistoriska risksmuseet

Notodontidae
Moths described in 1758
Moths of Africa
Moths of Asia
Moths of Europe
Taxa named by Carl Linnaeus